Twentieth Army or 20th Army may refer to:

Twentieth Army (Japan), a unit of the Imperial Japanese Army
20th Army (Soviet Union)
20th Group Army, People's Liberation Army
20th Guards Army, Soviet Union and Russia
20th Mountain Army (Wehrmacht), a German unit in WWII